Pyotr Nikolayevich Shabelsky-Bork (5 May 1893 – 18 August 1952) was a Russian officer and writer, active in far-right and anti-Semitic politics in early 20th-century Europe, best known for the assassination of Vladimir Nabokov, father of the novelist of the same name, in Berlin on 28 March 1922. Shabelsky-Bork collaborated with the Nazi Party until the end of World War II, working thereafter on monarchist and Orthodox Christian publications in South America until his death in 1952.

Biography 
Pyotr Nikolaevich Popov was born on 5 May 1893, in Kislovodsk, Russian Empire, to a family of wealthy landowners. Popov's mother was a leading member of the Union of the Russian People, and was an editor of a Black Hundreds periodical published in Saint Petersburg. Popov studied at the University of Kharkiv before joining the Imperial Russian Army during the outbreak of First World War in 1914, serving at the rank of second lieutenant in the Ingush Cavalry Regiment of the Caucasian Native Cavalry Division. After the February Revolution Popov retired from the military, but after the October Revolution in 1917 he was imprisoned by the Bolsheviks for being the member of a monarchist organization, and on 3 January 1918 the Petrograd Revolutionary Tribunal sentenced him to imprisonment and forced community service for a period of nine months. While in prison Popov met with far-right writer Fyodor Viktorovich Vinberg, which subsequently contributed to the emigration. On 1 May 1918, Popov and Vinberg were amnestied on the occasion of "international proletarian solidarity", and shortly after their release travelled to Kiev where they emigrated to Germany with German soldiers retreating from the city after it was captured by Ukrainian nationalist troops belonging to Symon Petliura.

Germany 
Popov adopted the pseudonym Pyotr Nikolayevich Shabelsky-Bork, originally for his literary works, which was derived from his godmother Elisaveta Aleksandrovna Shabelskaya-Bork. Soon after his arrival in Berlin, Shabelsky-Bork became closely associated with General Vasily Biskupsky and Sergey Taboritsky, who had also fled from Russia to Germany in the aftermath of World War I. Biskupsky was a leading member of the part of the White Russian émigré community involved in German far-right politics, which Shabelsky-Bork eventually joined and became an important promoter of the notorious Protocols of Zion. Shabelsky-Bork also began working with Fyodor Viktorovich Vinberg, and the two collaborated in the production of a yearbook, Luch Sveta ("A Ray of Light"). In the third issue of this periodical (May 1920) the complete text of the 1911 edition of Sergei Nilus's book was published.

Assassination of Vladimir Dmitrievich Nabokov 
On 28 March 1922, Shabelsky-Bork and Taboritsky were the two assassins responsible for the death of Vladimir Dmitrievich Nabokov during a failed assassination. The intended target, Pavel Milyukov, was a leading member of the Constitutional Democratic Party (commonly known as the Kadets), a Russian liberal centrist political party known for their strong support for full citizenship for all of Russia's minorities and Jewish emancipation. The party had been forced to leave the country after Bolshevik victory in the Russian Civil War, and was holding a political conference in absentia in Berlin. Nabokov attempted to stop the assassination, but was shot twice by Taboritsky and died instantly. For the crime, Shabelsky-Bork and Taboritsky received a sentence of 14 years imprisonment by German authorities, but were released shortly after commencing their sentence due to an amnesty.

Collaboration with the Nazis 
After his release, Shabelsky-Bork continued his work with far-right political movements in Germany, eventually becoming involved with Adolf Hitler and the National Socialist German Workers Party (NSDAP), whom he hoped would restore the monarchy in Germany. When the NSDAP came to power in 1933, Shabelsky-Bork was involved in organizing pro-Nazi groups among the Russian population in Germany such as the ROND (Russian Popular Liberation Movement). At the same time, Shabelsky was living a very meager existence: Biskupsky made various attempts to secure a job for "the most minimal salary" for his protege, however these efforts were fruitless.

Death 
In the spring of 1945, in the closing days of World War II, Shabelsky-Bork fled from Germany after his Berlin home was destroyed during an air raid. Shabelsky-Bork moved to Buenos Aires, Argentina, and was involved in the production of monarchist and Orthodox Christian publications across South America until his death from tuberculosis on 18 August 1952.

References 

1893 births
1952 deaths
People from Kislovodsk
People from Kuban Oblast
Russian military personnel of World War I
National University of Kharkiv alumni
Russian anti-communists
Russian people convicted of murder
White Russian emigrants to Germany
Prisoners and detainees of Germany
White Russian emigrants to Argentina
German monarchists
20th-century Russian criminals
20th-century deaths from tuberculosis
20th-century Russian journalists
Tuberculosis deaths in Argentina
Russian fascists
German fascists